Dias or DIAS may refer to:
 Desmoteplase In Acute Stroke, a series of clinical trials investigating the clinical efficacy of desmoteplase, a thrombolytic agent, in treating acute ischaemic stroke
 Destruction in Art Symposium
 Detaşamentul de Poliţie pentru Intervenţie Rapidă (Special Actions and Interventions Detachment), a former name of Romanian police rapid response units
 Dias (surname), a common surname in the Portuguese language, namely in Portugal and Brazil. It is cognate to the Spanish language surname Díaz
 Dias (Диас), a Soviet first name, which became widespread in honour to Spanish communist politician José Díaz
 Dias (Lycia), a city of ancient Lycia
 Direct Internet Access System
 Dublin Institute for Advanced Studies
 Viola (trawler), a steam trawler built in 1906 as the Viola and renamed Dias
 Dias (Δίας), the Modern Greek name for god Zeus
 Dias (ΔΙ.ΑΣ), a police motorcycle unit of the Hellenic Police
 Reversal film,  a type of photographic film that produces a positive image on a transparent base; diafilm, diapositives
 Copernicus Data and Information Access Services (DIAS), a European Commission initiative aimed at facilitating and standardizing access to satellite data.
 Dias (mythology), two figures in Greek mythology

See also 
 Diaz (disambiguation)